This article contains a list of notable people from the Namasudra caste, organized by profession, field, or focus.

Social reformers 

 Harichand Thakur, founder of Matua Mahasangha
 Binapani Devi, the matriarch of Matua community, also known as "Boro Maa".

Judiciary and bureaucracy 

 Justice Bankim Chandra Ray, former judge of the Supreme Court of India
 Upendra Nath Biswas, former joint director and Minister (East) of the CBI, MLA from Bagdah and former Minister of Backward Classes & Welfare of Government of West Bengal. (2011–16)
 Mukunda Behari Mullick, former lawyer, professor of Pali, senate member in Calcutta University, founder of All Bengal Namasudra Association, MLA and minister in first Fazlul Haq's government
 Sumit Mullick, IAS officer from the 1982 batch and former Chief Secretary of Maharashtra

Politicians

Ministers 

 Jogendra Nath Mandal, one of the leading founding fathers of the modern state of Pakistan and first minister of law and labour of the country
 Birat Chandra Mandal, minister and member of Constituent Assembly of Pakistan
 Kanti Biswas, former MLA of Gaighata and minister of Youth Affairs and Home (Passport)
 Manjul Krishna Thakur, MLA from Gaighata and Minister of State 
 Shantanu Thakur, M.P from Bangaon and Minister of State of Ministry of Ports, Shipping and Waterways in the Second Modi ministry (2021–present).

MPs and MLA 
 Apurba Lal Majumdar, two-time MLA and former speaker of West Bengal Legislative Assembly
 Kapil Krishna Thakur, former Sanghadhipati of Matua Mahasangha and M.P from Bangaon
 Mamata Bala Thakur, religious mother of the Matua Mahasangha and M.P from Bangaon
 Pramatha Ranjan Thakur, former MLA and head of Matua Mahasangha

Writers and journalists 

 Debi Roy, one of the founding fathers of the Hungry generation movement, and the first post-modern Dalit poet in Bengali
 Manoranjan Bayapari, Indian Bengali writer and socio-political activist, also known as the pioneer of ‘Dalit literature in Bengali’
 Manohar Mauli Biswas, bilingual poet, essayist and writer of Bengali Dalit Literature
 Jatin Bala, Bangladeshi, Dalit author
 Baby Haldar, Indian Bengali author
 Kalyani Thakur, Dalit feminist writer
 Rebati Mohan Sarkar, Indian writer, MLC and editor of Namashudra Hitaishi

See also 

 Namasudra
 Chandala

References 

Indian castes